In the Heart of the Machine is a 2021 Bulgarian thriller drama film  directed by Martin Makariev from a screenplay co-written with Boby Zahariev. The film features an ensemble cast that includes Alexander Sano, Hristo Shopov, Igor Angelov, Ivaylo Hristov, Julian Vergov, Hristo Petkov, Stoyan Doychev, Vladimir Zombori and Bashar Rahal.

The film won the Best Feature Film award at the 2021 Golden Rose Film Festival and the 2022 Sofia Film Fest. It was selected as the Bulgarian entry for the Best International Feature Film at the 95th Academy Awards, but was not nominated.

Plot
In 1978, Bohemy, a young prisoner serving at the Central Prison in Sofia, is given a chance to shorten his sentence if he gathers a crew to double production during their work at the Kremikovtsi plant. He assembles a team composed of the Hatchet, a terrible double murderer, the problematic criminal the Needle, the elderly Teacher and the gypsy Krasy. Their problems begin when the Hatchet refuses to turn on his lathe because a pigeon is stuck inside it. Despite Captain Vekilsky, the plant's warden, ordering him to turn on the lathe, the Hatchet categorically refuses, takes the rookie warden Kovachky hostage, and announces that he will not start work until the pigeon is rescued.

The situation quickly escalates and becomes increasingly complicated after more guards arrive and the Teacher is killed in an attempt to negotiate with them. Gradually, the prisoners realise that the only way to deal with the situation is to rescue the bird as the Hatchet wishes.

Cast
Alexander Sano as Bohemy
Hristo Shopov as Colonel Radoev
Igor Angelov as Satura / the Hatchet
Ivaylo Hristov as Daskala / the Teacher
Julian Vergov as Captain Vekilsky
Hristo Petkov as Iglata / the Needle
Stoyan Doychev as Krasy / the Gypsy
Vladimir Zombori as Private Kovachky
Bashar Rahal as Captain Kozarev

Release
The film premiered on 26 September 2021 at the 39th Golden Rose Film Festival, and was released in theatres on 18 March 2022.

Accolades

See also
 List of submissions to the 95th Academy Awards for Best International Feature Film
 List of Bulgarian submissions for the Academy Award for Best International Feature Film

References

External links

2021 films
2021 thriller drama films
Bulgarian thriller drama films
2020s Bulgarian-language films
Films set in Bulgaria
Films shot in Bulgaria
Films shot in Sofia
2020s prison films
Films set in factories
Films set in 1978
Thriller films based on actual events